Joseph Patrick Lynch ( – January 1954) was an Irish politician. He was elected unopposed as a Sinn Féin Teachta Dála (TD) to the 2nd Dáil at the 1921 elections for the Leix–Offaly constituency. He supported the Anglo-Irish Treaty and voted in favour of it. He stood as a pro-Treaty Sinn Féin candidate at the 1922 general election but was not elected.

References

1954 deaths
Early Sinn Féin TDs
Members of the 2nd Dáil
Year of birth uncertain